Jeolgang Paeng clan was one of the Korean clans. Their Bon-gwan was in Zhejiang, China. According to the research in 2000, the number of Jeolgang Paeng clan was 1578. He was a general in Ming dynasty who was dispatched to Joseon as reinforcements from Ming dynasty during Japanese invasions of Korea. He made a lot of achievements as well as his son, Paeng Sin go. After that, he was naturalized to Joseon with Paeng Sin go.

See also 
 Korean clan names of foreign origin

References

External links 
 

 
Korean clan names of Chinese origin